Khoy Airport  is an airport that serves Khoy, Iran.

Airlines and destinations

References

External links

Airports in Iran
Buildings and structures in West Azerbaijan Province
Transportation in West Azerbaijan Province